The Fiji crested iguana or Fijian crested iguana (Brachylophus vitiensis) is a critically endangered species of iguana native to some of the northwestern islands of the Fijiian archipelago, where it is found in dry forest on Yaduataba (west of Vanua Levu), Yadua, Macuata, Yaquaga, Devuilau (Goat island), Malolo, Monu and Monuriki.

Discovery
The discovery of B. vitiensis is partially indebted to The Blue Lagoon. Part of the movie was filmed on a remote island in Fiji and shots of the native wildlife, including a large colorful iguanid, were included. Herpetologist Dr. John Gibbons of the University of the South Pacific had discovered the iguana on a different Fijian island, but it wasn't until his associate had spotted the same iguana among the film's wildlife that its larger range was known. Gibbons described the new species in 1981 with reference to The Blue Lagoon.

Taxonomy and etymology
The generic name, Brachylophus, is derived from two Greek words: brachys (βραχῦς) meaning "short" and lophos (λοφος) meaning "crest" or "plume", denoting the short spiny crests along the back of this species.  The specific name, vitiensis, is a Latin toponymic adjective derived from the Fijian word for Fiji.

The species B. vitiensis is closely related to the Lau banded iguana (B. fasciatus) and Fiji banded iguana (B. bulabula).

Habitat
B. vitiensis is found on the islands of Fiji, in the South Pacific. The species is restricted to tropical dry forests, specifically to the rain shadow forests located on certain islands in Fiji.  These forests are one of the most threatened vegetation types in the Pacific. A small population of the Fiji crested iguana – fewer than 80 individuals – can be found on the small island of Macuata. The majority of this species – fewer than 4,000 individuals – is most commonly found on the island of Yadua Taba. The island is a National Trust of Fiji reserve, and is thus the only legally protected population of the Fiji crested iguana. The island is now also free of forest burning and the presence of goats, which was a major factor in the initial decline of the species.  There are some other Fijian islands where evidence of the species has been recorded: Deviulau, Waya, Monuriki, Monu, Qalito (possibly extinct),  Yaquaga, Yadua, Yaduataba and Malolo Levu.

The critically small population on Malolo Levu seems to qualify as a subspecies, B. vitiensis pricei, as it differs in its DNA on 7 alleles in comparison to B. vitiensis from Macuata. A small protected forestation area was created recently for the last 17 crested iguanas that survived. Juveniles have been reported on the site, indicating some degree of reproduction is ongoing. However, the outlook for this subpopulation is a matter of great concern. According to Steve Anstey of Ahura Resorts there are currently only 15 iguanas left in the forest remnants at Likuliku Lodge and 6 at Malolo Resort. Conservation programs initiated for the Likuliku and Malolo populations include a captive head start facility and reforestation programs led by Likuliku's environmental officer Sia Rasalato.
The species probably inhabited land up to 500 meters above sea level in the recent past, but is currently only found at elevations of 100 meters or less.

Description

The Fiji crested iguana is a large stocky lizard distinguished from the Fiji banded iguana by the presence of three narrow, cream to white colored bands on males, rather than the broader bluish bands of the latter species. These whitish bands often have chevrons of black scales close to them. It is further distinguished by the presence of a taller spiny "crest" on its back with spines as long as  running from the nape of the neck to the base of its tail.

When Fiji crested iguanas first hatch from their eggs they are dark green, but after several hours their skin becomes bright emerald green and narrow white bands can be seen along their body. Their eyes are reddish orange or pinkish gold in color.

Behaviour
The Fiji crested iguana is a diurnal creature that tends to live under the shade of trees and will seek sunlight/heat on days with cool temperature. It has the ability to rapidly change colour from green to black when aroused. It uses this ability when threatened by any potential predator in its surroundings. These colours will vary depending on the severity of the situation, bright green is standard, dark green would be slightly dangerous, and black would be an extreme. If its white bands or its sudden change in colour has not intimidated its predator, it will ultimately resort to an expansion of its neck, a bobbing of its head, and it will pounce itself towards the potential threat. In order to move from tree to tree where it usually resides, it uses the overlapping branches in order to move effectively through their environments. Their long toes and tails help them keep balance while they move through the trees.

Diet
Fiji crested iguanas are predominantly herbivorous feeding on the leaves, fruits, shoots, and flowers from trees and shrubs. These iguanas eat both the new leaves and the large flowers from trees and shrubs. Hence, it is restricted and limited to tropical dry forests and similar habitats on islands in western Fiji. Furthermore, the Fiji crested iguanas particularly have a preference for sweet hibiscus flowers of the Vau tree (Hibiscus tiliaceus). The vau tree is one of the species of trees where they spend most of their time residing. Fiji crested iguanas do not display any major or significant seasonal shifts, sex differences, or age-class differences in their diet patterns. Moreover, scientists have observed captive hatchlings even eating insects; nonetheless, adults will not.

Reproduction
The Fiji crested iguana, similar to all other iguanas, reproduces by laying eggs. The breeding season takes place between March and April, with courtship and mating commencing in January. They lay large white eggs, which have a leathery texture. The species is oviparous and has one of the longest incubation periods of any reptile, which can last from 189 days to nine months.  Female iguanas are usually found defending the eggs and guard the nest of four to six eggs. Females dig holes on the forest floor, where three to five eggs are laid and they then fill the hole or burrow. The eggs are white and leathery, with the average number of eggs in a clutch being four

Eggs take roughly 8–9 months (October–November) to hatch and this occurs at the beginning of the wet season.  A few of weeks prior to hatching, a brown oval mark arises on the surface of the egg. This oval mark identifies the spot where the baby iguana's head will pop out of the egg. Sometimes, a full day can pass before the Fiji crested iguana hatches from the egg.  After hatching, the baby iguanas obtain moisture by licking wet leaves.

Iguanas and man

Folklore

The Fijian name for iguana is vokai, although some tribes call it saumuri.  Two tribes regard the iguana as their totem and as such its name is not allowed to be mentioned in the presence of women or the offender may be beaten with a stick.  The majority of Fijians, however, are terrified of the crested iguana because of its behavior when threatened.

Threats
The biggest threat the Fiji crested iguana faces is habitat loss due to fires, storms, agricultural development, and competition from feral goats.  Goats were introduced to Yadua Taba in 1972 and numbered over 200 by the late 1970s. The vegetation on the island during this time was severely depleted by a combination of grazing and fires used to drive goats for ease of capture.  After the discovery of the Fiji crested iguana, the island was declared a sanctuary and all but a few goats were removed and fires banned. As a result, the dry forest on the island has recovered to a great extent and is the best remaining example of Pacific dry forest. Invasive Leucaena trees threaten the regeneration of native food trees for the iguanas, but the government of Fiji has taken steps to eradicate the trees.

A secondary threat is introduced predators in the forms of rats, mongooses, and cats which prey on the Fiji crested iguana and its eggs.   Additionally the lizard has been hunted as a food source and for the illegal animal trade.

In 2002, five adult Fiji crested iguanas were stolen from the sanctuary, but Fiji Custom officers caught the smuggler before he boarded his international flight.  Since this incident, tourist visits to the sanctuary have been prohibited and only researchers are permitted to visit the island.  In order to protect iguanas in the sanctuary from diseases and parasites, it is not permitted to return to the island any lizard that has been removed.

Conservation
Due to the removal of the goats, forest area was increased by 10–20% since 1980, which means more resources for the Fiji crested iguana and a larger environment. There are many other recommended actions that should be taken in order for them to survive. A major threat to the Fiji crested iguana is posed by introduced predators such as feral cats, rats, and mongooses. It is widely campaigned that physical measures should be taken to protect the iguanas from cats and mongooses, which include removing them from the area similar to the removal of the goats. Also, the only island being monitored is Yadua Taba Island. Other islands inhabited by Fiji crested iguanas such as Macuata, Monu, and Monuriki are also being campaigned to be monitored. Another action that have been raised is reforestation. The iguanas need more resources in order to repopulate, which means having more trees growing on the island may increase food sources for the Fiji crested iguana and hence repopulate the area.

However, the available data on this species is fairly limited. There is little data on “the effects of direct or indirect factors potentially responsible for causing the population crash.” Without some detailed data on that topic, “any Species Recovery Plan developed is not likely to be cost effective and may fail to achieve the desired results.”

References

External links

Brachylophus
Endemic fauna of Fiji
Iguana, Fiji
Critically endangered fauna of Oceania
Reptiles described in 1981
Taxa named by John Richard Hutchinson Gibbons